Vineet Kumar Singh (born 28 August 1978) is an Indian actor and writer known for his strong portrayal of an aspiring boxer Shravan Kumar Singh in Mukkabaaz (2018). A M.D. in Ayurveda from Government Medical College and Hospital, Nagpur, Vineet began his acting career at the age of 21 with the movie Pitaah (2002). After few series of performances in his early career including the 2010 film City of Gold, he got noticed for his role in films like Bombay Talkies  and Gangs of Wasseypur. His role in Ugly and the portrayal of the character Milan Shukla in the film Daas Dev won him appreciation. He made his debut as lead actor in the 2018 Anurag Kashyap film Mukkabaaz for which he won two awards.

Early life
Vineet Singh was born in Varanasi, Uttar Pradesh on 28 August 1978 in a Rajput family. He was interested in sports and played Basketball on a National level. His father is a mathematician. Though Vineet wanted to join the National School of Drama, he could not pursue the same due to parental pressure and social norms. He is CPMT qualified and topper from his Medical College. He is a licensed medical practitioner, having attained his Bachelor of Ayurveda, Medicine and Surgery degree from R. A. Podar Ayurved Medical College and MD (Doctor of Medicine) in Ayurveda from Government Medical College and Hospital, Nagpur.

Personal life 
He tied the knot with longtime girlfriend Ruchiraa on 29 November 2021.

Career 
Vineet Singh came to Mumbai to participate in Superstars Talent Hunt. After winning the competition, actor-director Mahesh Manjrekar, who was one of the judges gave him a role in the Sanjay Dutt starrer Pitaah. The film was received poorly and Singh faced trouble getting further roles. He then worked as an associate / assistant director for Mahesh Manjrekar in films like Viruddh (2005) and Deh. In 2007, Singh left direction to focus solely on acting. After doing a few Bhojpuri serials and insignificant roles in films like Gori Tere Pyaar Mein and Isaaq, he got his break in the Hindi-Marathi bilingual City of Gold (2010). It was after film, he was cast by director Anurag Kashyap for the role of Danish Khan in Gangs of Wasseypur. He then acted in Ugly and Bombay Talkies (2013). His role in Ugly got him his first Screen nomination for Best Supporting Actor. He also appeared in Birla Sunlife and 7up Nimbooz commercials. Vineet was seen opposite Raima Sen in the 2016 Film Bollywood Diaries, directed by K.D. Satyam. In the 2018 film Mukkabaaz, the actor played the role of a boxer. Kumar trained hard for two years to prepare himself as the protagonist of this Anurag Kashyap film. Kumar also won huge appreciation for his role of Milan Shukla in the film Daas Dev, directed by Sudhir Mishra. Kumar has appeared in Akshay Kumar-starrer Gold (2018). In 2018, Singh was signed as the main lead with Prithvi Hatte in Aadhaar directed by Suman Ghosh and produced by Manish Mundra's Drishyam Films which deals with the government's controversial Aadhaar program.

In 2019, Vineet Singh had a supporting role in Saand Ki Aankh. His upcoming projects include the biopic Gunjan Saxena co-starring Janhvi Kapoor, scheduled to release in March 2020. and a Hindi remake of the Tamil film Thiruttu Payale 2, in which he will be seen opposite Urvashi Rautela.

In the Critics Choice Film Awards 2019, Vineet Singh received the Best Actor (male) award for his role in Mukkabaaz. He was nominated for Best Actor (Critics) award in the 64th Filmfare Awards for the film Mukkabaaz.

Filmography

Web series

Awards and nominations

References

External links
 

1978 births
Living people
21st-century Indian male actors
Male actors in Hindi cinema
Indian male screenwriters
Male actors from Varanasi